Patriarch Eutychius may refer to:

 Patriarch Eutychius of Constantinople (512–582), Patriarch of Constantinople and saint
 Patriarch Eutychius of Alexandria (877–940), Greek Patriarch of Alexandria and historian